Suriana is a monotypic genus of flowering plants containing only Suriana maritima, which is commonly known as bay cedar.

Distribution
It has a pantropical distribution and can be found on coasts in the New and Old World tropics.

Description
The grey-green, succulent foliage yields an aroma similar to that of cedar when crushed, hence the common name. Its yellow flowers are solitary or in short cymes among the leaves. Bay cedar flowers throughout the year. After fertilisation, the flowers form clusters of five dry, hard drupes  in diameter. The drupes are buoyant and can maintain the viability of the seeds during long periods in seawater, allowing the seeds to be dispersed by the ocean.

References

Surianaceae
Monotypic Fabales genera
Pantropical flora
Halophytes